Truckee Tahoe Airport  is a public airport two miles east of Truckee, California, United States. The airport is in both Nevada County and Placer County. It is owned by Truckee Tahoe Airport District, a bi-county special district. The FAA's National Plan of Integrated Airport Systems for 2009–2013 called it a general aviation airport.

Many U.S. airports use the same three-letter location identifier for the FAA and IATA, but Truckee Tahoe Airport is TRK to the FAA and TKF to IATA. (IATA lists TRK as Juwata Airport in Tarakan, North Kalimantan, Indonesia.)

Facilities

A seasonal control tower opened June 1, 2017 and operated through September 15. The tower reopened in December of 2017 as a year round tower. The tower opens daily at 0700L. Closing times change depending on the season. 

In 2016 the District reported 32,524 aircraft operations.

In 2004 the airport had 35,000 aircraft operations, average 95 per day: 97% general aviation, 3% air taxi, and less than 1% military. 91 aircraft were then based at this airport: 80.2% single-engine, 13.2% multi-engine, 2.2% jet, 3.3% glider and 1.1% ultralight.

While the airport does not offer any commercial service, such service is available from Reno-Tahoe International Airport.

Both runways are lighted. Density altitude can exceed  in summer months. Downdrafts can occur on final to RWY 20. Glider pilots use left traffic RWY 20. Powered aircraft use right traffic RWY 20.

100LL and Jet A are available 7am - 7pm, and self serve 100LL is available 7am - 9pm. There are 210 paved tie-downs for transient parking, no landing fees and low overnight tie-down fees.

The airport is attended seven days a week, 7am - 9pm. Snow removal equipment is operated round-the-clock as needed. Pre-heating services and aircraft maintenance are offered by local FBOs. No de-icing services are available.

The airport had a 500-gallon underground heating oil tank removed in 1986. Small amounts of oil that had leaked were monitored and removed; six remaining above-ground tanks were functioning satisfactorily and are regularly tested.

Instrument departures
IFR clearances can be requested from the tower when in operation, and, when the tower is closed, from Oakland Center on frequency 127.95, which can be reached from most of the field.

Accidents and incidents
On December 28, 2005, a Learjet 35A jet stalled during a circling approach to the airport. Both pilots were killed.
On June 15, 2021, a Cirrus SR20 aircraft with two occupants crashed into Martis Valley shortly after departing from the airport. One occupant was killed, while the other sustained injuries.
On July 26, 2021, a Bombardier Challenger 600 business jet crashed while on approach to the airport, in a wooded area near Ponderosa Golf Course. All six occupants on board were killed.

References

External links 
 Truckee Tahoe Airport, official site
 Aerial image as of 26 August 1998 from USGS The National Map
 

Truckee, California
Airports in Nevada County, California
Airports in Placer County, California